TKP (Tajuk Kriminal dan Perkotaan)  (English: Crime and Urban Headlines)  was a crime news program that aired on Trans 7 in Indonesia. The program was launched on January 21, 2002, by TV 7,. and broadcast crime news daily. The program ended on July 30, 2009.

References 

Indonesian television news shows
Indonesian-language television shows
Trans7 original programming
2002 Indonesian television series debuts
2000s Indonesian television series
2009 Indonesian television series endings